"It's a Shame (My Sister)" is a 1990 hip hop song recorded by British rapper Monie Love, featuring True Image. It was the second single from her debut album Down to Earth, and was released in late 1990 in Germany and the UK and in early 1991 in the other European countries. The song sampled The Spinners' 1970 single "It's a Shame" written for the band by Stevie Wonder, where as the "Cool as..." mix samples the guitar riff from the Sister Sledge hit "He's the Greatest Dancer". The song had some success, particularly in Switzerland where it peaked at number 6 and charted for 21 weeks. In the United States, the song was Monie Love's sole hit single, reaching number 26. "It's a Shame (My Sister)" also peaked at number 2 on the American dance chart.

Track listings
7" single
 "It's a Shame (My Sister)" (Album version) – 3:43
 "It's a Shame (My Sister)" (Cool as... mix) – 6:35

CD maxi
 "It's a Shame (My Sister)" (Album version) - 3:43
 "It's a Shame (My Sister)" (Ultimatum mix) – 5:29
 "It's a Shame (My Sister)" (Cool as... mix) – 6:35

12" maxi/Cassette
 "It's a Shame (My Sister)" (Monie dee mix) – 5:28
 "It's a Shame (My Sister)" (Ultimatum mix) – 5:29
 "It's a Shame (My Sister)" (Def reprise) – 2:30
 "It's a Shame (My Sister)" (Cool as... mix) – 6:35
 "It's a Shame (My Sister)" (Red zone mix) – 4:30
 "Race Against Reality" – 3:03

CD single – promo
 "It's a Shame (My Sister)" (Album version) – 3:43
 "It's a Shame (My Sister)" (Cool as... mix - edit) – 3:34
 "It's a Shame (My Sister)" (Cool as... mix) – 6:35
 "It's a Shame (My Sister)" (Ultimatum mix) – 5:29
 "It's a Shame (My Sister)" (Hot shot mix) – 7:12

Credits
 Written by Stevie Wonder, David Steele, Monie Love, Lee Garrett and Syreeta Wright
 Backgrounds vocals by True Image
 Produced by Andy Cox and David Steele
 Remixes by David Morales, Ultimatum and John Waddell
 Artwork by Eddie Monsoon

Charts

References

1990 singles
1991 singles
Monie Love songs
Songs written by Lee Garrett
1990 songs
Warner Records singles
Songs written by Syreeta Wright
Songs written by Stevie Wonder